Juan Carlos Portillo González (born 7 July 1970) is a Spanish retired footballer who played as a midfielder.

Club career
Born in Málaga, Andalusia, Portillo joined Levante UD in 1993 after a spell at Real Balompédica Linense. In the 1994 summer he signed for UD Almería also in Segunda División B, winning promotion in his first season.

Portillo appeared in his first match as a professional on 3 September 1995, starting and being sent off in a 1–1 home draw against CD Leganés in the Segunda División. He scored his first goal in the category on 2 November of the following year, netting his team's first in a 2–1 home win over RCD Mallorca.

After being relegated in 1997, Portillo stayed two more years with the Rojiblancos, dropping another level in 1999.

References

External links
 

1970 births
Living people
Footballers from Málaga
Spanish footballers
Association football midfielders
Segunda División players
Segunda División B players
Tercera División players
Real Balompédica Linense footballers
Levante UD footballers
UD Almería players